A list of stratovolcanoes follows below.

Africa

Cameroon 
 Mount Cameroon

Democratic Republic of Congo 
 Mount Nyiragongo, Goma; designated as a Decade Volcano
 It contains an active lava lake inside its crater which overflowed due to cracks in 2002.
 Mount Mikeno

Eritrea 
 Alid Volcano
 Dubbi Volcano
 Nabro Volcano

Ethiopia 
 Adwa
 Borawli, Afar Region
 Dabbahu Volcano
 Mount Fentale

Kenya 
 Mount Kenya, which contains several volcanic plugs on its peak.
 Mount Longonot

Rwanda 
 Mount Bisoke, on the border between Rwanda and the Democratic Republic of the Congo.
 Mount Gahinga, on the border between Rwanda and Uganda.
 Mount Karisimbi, on the border between Rwanda and the Democratic Republic of the Congo.
 Mount Muhabura, on the border between Rwanda and Uganda.
 Mount Sabyinyo, marks the border between Rwanda, Uganda, and the Democratic Republic of the Congo.

Tanzania 
 Ol Doinyo Lengai, the Earth's only active carbonatite lava-producing volcano.
 Mount Kilimanjaro, a dormant stratovolcano. It is the highest point of Africa.
 Mount Meru

Mid-Atlantic Ridge
 Mount Pico in Pico Island, Azores, Portugal
 Teide in Tenerife, Canary Islands, Spain; designated as a Decade Volcano
 Cumbre Vieja in La Palma, Canary Islands, Spain
 Mount Fogo in Fogo, Cape Verde
 Green Mountain, Ascension Island
Pico de las Nieves in Gran Canaria, Canary Islands, Spain

Americas

Caribbean
 La Grande Soufrière on Basse-Terre Island, Guadeloupe
 Soufriere Hills on the island Montserrat
 Its 1995 eruptions resulted in the abandonment of its capital city, Plymouth.
 Soufrière on the island Saint Vincent
 Mount Pelée on the island Martinique
 Its devastating eruption on 8 May 1902 resulted in the complete destruction of its capital city, Saint-Pierre, with the deaths of more than 30,000 inhabitants within it.
 Mount Liamuiga on the island of Saint Kitts in St. Kitts and Nevis.
 Nevis Peak on the island of Nevis in St. Kitts and Nevis.
 Mount Scenery on the island Saba in the Caribbean Netherlands
 The Quill on the island Sint Eustatius in the Caribbean Netherlands

Central America

Costa Rica
 Arenal, Chato and Poás in Alajuela
 Irazu and Turrialba in Cartago

El Salvador
 San Miguel
 Chinameca
 Santa Ana
 Chichontepec
 Guazapa
 Taburete
 Izalco

Honduras
Isla Zacate Grande
Tiger Island

Guatemala
 Volcán Tacaná on the border between Mexico and Guatemala
 Volcán Tajumulco
 It is the highest point and highest volcano in Central America
 Volcán Cerro Quemado (Almolonga)
 Volcán Santa María; designated a Decade Volcano. 
 It has a smaller peak called Santiaguito.
 Volcán Siete Orejas
 Volcán San Pedro
 Volcán Atitlán
 Volcán Tolimán
 Acatenango
 Volcán de Fuego. 
 It erupted in June 2018.
 Volcán de Agua
 Pacaya
 Tecuamburro
 Tahual
 Volcán Jumay
 Volcán Ipala
 Suchitán
 Volcán Moyuta
 Volcán Chingo on the border between Guatemala and El Salvador

Nicaragua
 Concepción
 Cosigüina
 Mombacho
 Momotombo
 Rota
 San Cristóbal Volcano
 Telica

Panama
 Volcán Barú
 El Valle
 La Yeguada

North America

Canada

Northwest Territories/Nunavut
 Back River volcanic complex

Northern British Columbia
 Hoodoo Mountain
 Mount Edziza

Southern British Columbia
 Mount Boucherie
 Mount Cayley (see also Mount Cayley volcanic field) 
 Mount Garibaldi
 Mount Meager massif 
 About 2,400 years ago, it produced the most recent major catastrophic eruption in Canada.
 Mount Price
 The Black Tusk
 Coquihalla Mountain

Mexico 
 Popocatépetl, 70 km (43 mi) southeast of Mexico City
 Colima; designated as a Decade Volcano
 Nevado de Toluca
 Pico de Orizaba

United States

Alaska
 Mount Akutan
 Augustine Volcano
 Mount Bona
 Mount Churchill
 Mount Cleveland
 Mount Edgecumbe
 Frosty Peak Volcano
 Mount Katmai
 Korovin Volcano
 Mount Mageik
 Mount Pavlof
 Mount Redoubt
 Mount Shishaldin
 Mount Vsevidof

Washington (state)
 Mount Baker
 Glacier Peak
 Mount Rainier; designated as a Decade Volcano
 Mount St. Helens
 On May 18, 1980, it produced a large eruption preceded by a massive landslide which decimated the volcano's height.
 Mount Adams

Oregon
 Mount Hood
 Mount Jefferson
 Black Butte
 The Three Sisters
 Broken Top
 Mount Bachelor
Mount Scott (Klamath County, Oregon)
Mount McLoughlin
Mount Mazama

California
 Mount Shasta
 Mount Tehama

Arizona
 San Francisco Mountain

New Mexico
 Mount Taylor

South America

Chile
 Llaima
 Irruputuncu on the border of Bolivia and Chile
 Ojos del Salado on the border between Argentina and Chile
 It is the highest volcano in the world. 
 Villarrica
 Osorno
 Cerro Arenales
 Calbuco
 It erupted in April 2015.
 Callaqui
 Mount Hudson
 Copahue
 Lascar Volcano
 Nevados de Chillán
 Lanín on the border between Argentina and Chile
 Acotango on the border between Bolivia and Chile
 Cerro Solo on the border between Chile and Argentina
 Parinacota 
 It erupted in April 2008
 Licancabur
 Sierra Nevada
 Chaitén
 Acamarachi
 Marmolejo 
It is the southernmost mountain with more than 6000 msmm
 San José 
 Plantat

Colombia
 Galeras; designated a Decade Volcano.
 Nevado del Ruiz
 A 1985 eruption created destructive lahar floods which engulfed the nearby town of Armero.

Ecuador
 Pichincha Volcano
 Tungurahua
 Sangay
 Reventador
 Chimborazo
 Cotopaxi
 Antisana
 Cayambe
 Corazón
 El Altar
 Carihuairazo

Peru
 Coropuna
 Huaynaputina
 El Misti
 Sabancaya
 Ubinas
 Tutupaca
 Yucamane

Antarctica
 Mount Erebus
 Penguin Island
Mount Bird
Brown Peak
Mount Discovery
Mount Vernon Harcourt
Mount Melbourne
Mount Morning
Mount Overlord

Asia

Western Asia

Iran 
 Bazman
 Sahand
 Sabalan
 Mount Damavand
 Taftan Volcano

Turkey 

 Mount Hasan
 Mount Ararat and Little Ararat
 Mount Erciyes

Yemen 
 Jabal al-Tair, an island within the Red Sea

South Asia

India 
 Barren Island
 It is the only active stratovolcano in the Indian subcontinent

Southeast Asia

Indonesia 

 Mount Kerinci and Mount Sinabung in Sumatra
 Mount Rinjani in Lombok
 Mount Semeru and Mount Bromo in East Java. Together, they form the Bromo Tengger Semeru National Park.
 Mount Agung and Mount Batur in Bali
 Galunggung in West Java.
 Krakatoa. A violent eruption in August 1883 resulted in the obliteration of the three-peaked volcanic island. 
 Anak Krakatoa. It emerged from the sea in 1927-1930 
 Mount Merapi in Central Java. It is listed as a Decade Volcano.
 Mount Tambora in the island of Sumbawa. Its catastrophic eruption in 1815 caused a Year Without a Summer in 1816.
 Mount Kelud in East Java

Malaysia 
 Bombalai Hill in Sabah, Borneo

Myanmar 
 Mount Popa in Kyaukpadaung Township, Nyaung-U District

Philippines 

 Mayon Volcano in Albay, The most active volcano in the Philippines, famous for its perfect symmetrical cone shape.
 Mount Pinatubo in Zambales. The catastrophic June 1991 eruption, which formed a caldera, later filled by a crater lake, had global environmental effects.
 Mount Bulusan in Sorsogon
 Mount Kanlaon and Mount Talinis in Negros
 Mount Arayat in Pampanga
 Mount Iriga and Mount Isarog in Camarines Sur 
 Mount Mariveles and Mount Natib in Bataan
 Mount Malindig in Marinduque
 Mount Apo in Davao City, Mindanao. Considered a dormant volcano, it is the highest point of the Philippines
 Mount Makiling in Laguna
 Mount Banahaw in Quezon is one of the active volcanoes in the Philippines. Its 1730 eruption caused a debris avalanche and crater lake collapse which flooded Sariaya, Quezon.

East Asia

North Korea 
 Baekdu Mountain, on the border between North Korea and China

Japan

Akita Prefecture
 Mount Akita-Komagatake (part of the volcano lies within Iwate Prefecture)

Aomori Prefecture
 Hakkōda Mountains
 Mount Iwaki

Fukushima Prefecture
 Mount Adatara
 Mount Azuma-kofuji
 Mount Bandai

Gunma Prefecture
 Mount Haruna

Hokkaido
 Mount Aka (Daisetsuzan)
 Asahi-dake
 Mount Chienbetsu
 Mount Chinishibetsu
 Mount Dokkarimui
 Mount E
 Mount Eboshi
 Mount Eniwa
 Mount Fuppushi
 Mount Higashi
 Mount Iō (Shiretoko)
 Mount Kamui (Lake Mashū caldera)
 Mount Koizumi
 Kojima
 Mount Kuma
 Mount Maru (Esan)
 Mount Minami
 Mount Nagayama
 Mount Okkabake
 Mount Onnebetsu
 Mount Poromoi
 Mount Rausu
 Mount Rishiri
 Mount Rusha
 Mount Samakke Nupuri
 Mount Sashirui
 Mount Shari
 Mount Shibetsu
 Mount Shiretoko
 Mount Tarumae
 Mount Tokachi (Daisetsuzan)
 Mount Unabetsu
 Mount Usu
 Mount Yōtei

Iwate Prefecture
 Mount Iwate

Kagoshima Prefecture
 Akusekijima
 Mount Kaimon
 Kogajajima
 Kuchinoerabu-jima
 Nakanoshima
 Sakurajima, designated as a Decade Volcano
 Suwanosejima
 Yokoate-jima

Miyagi Prefecture
 Mount Funagata

Nagano Prefecture
 Mount Naeba (peak is shared with Niigata Prefecture)
 Mount asama

Nagasaki Prefecture
 Mount Unzen. Erupted in 1991. Listed as a Decade Volcano

Niigata Prefecture
 Mount Myōkō
 Mount Naeba (peak is shared with Nagano Prefecture)

Ōita Prefecture
 Mount Yufu

Shizuoka Prefecture
 Mount Fuji (peak is shared with Yamanashi Prefecture) Highest point of the country. Last erupted in 1708

Tochigi Prefecture
 Mount Nantai

Tokyo
 Mount Mihara on Izu Ōshima
 Miyake-jima

Yamagata Prefecture
 Mount Chōkai (part of the volcano lies within Akita Prefecture)
 Mount Goshō

Yamanashi Prefecture
 Mount Fuji (peak is shared with Shizuoka Prefecture)

Taiwan 
 Guishan Island

Northern Asia

Russia 

 Bezymianny
 Klyuchevskaya Sopka or Kliuchevskoi, Kamchatka Krai, the highest active volcano in Eurasia
 Shiveluch, Kamchatka Krai
 Avachinsky, Kamchatka Krai, a Decade Volcano
 Koryaksky, Kamchatka Krai, also a Decade Volcano
 Karymsky, Kamchatka Krai
 Alaid, Atlasov Island, Kuril Islands, Sakhalin oblast
 Mount Elbrus in the Caucasus. It is the highest point in the European continent.

Europe

Central Europe

Slovakia 
 Bogota, in Košice and Prešov.
 Makovica, in Košice and Prešov.
 Štiavnica, in Banská Bystrica.
Poľana, in Banská Bystrica region
 Strechový Vrch, in Košice and Prešov.
 Veľký Milič, in Košice and Prešov.
 Zlatá Baňa, in Prešov.

Germany 
 Kaiserstuhl, in Baden-Württemberg.

Western Europe

France 
 Monts du Cantal, in Cantal. Largest volcano in Europe by area. Most recent eruption occurred 2-3 MYA.
 Puy de Sancy, in Auvergne-Rhône-Alpes. Both the tallest mountain in the Massif Central and volcano in France. Most recent eruption occurred 200 thousand years ago.

United Kingdom 
 The Cheviot, in Northumberland, England.
 Esha Ness, in Shetland, Scotland.

Southern Europe

Greece 
 Milos, in the Aegean Sea.

Italy 
 Alban Hills, located 20 kilometers (12 miles) east of Rome in Lazio. Last eruption happened in about 5,000 BC.
 Monte Vulture. Complex stratovolcano.
 Mount Etna near Catania in Sicily. Tallest active volcano in Europe. Recently erupted in 2013 and volcanic activity is still ongoing. Listed as a Decade Volcano.
 Mount Vesuvius, located 09 kilometers (05.6 miles) east of Naples in Campania. Famous for its violent eruption in August 24, A.D. 79. Its last eruption happened in March 1944. Designated a Decade Volcano.
 Stromboli and Vulcano, two of the Lipari Islands. The former has been continuously erupting for more than two millennia, making it the second most active volcano in Europe.. The latter last erupted in 1890.

Caucasus

Armenia 
 Aragats

Georgia 
 Didi Abuli
 Mount Kazbek
 Mount Samsari
 Mount Tavkvetili
 Tsiteli Khati

Scandinavia

Iceland 
 Askja
 Bárðarbunga. Recently erupted between 2014 to 2015
 Eldfell and Helgafell in the island of Heimaey
 Eyjafjallajökull. Erupted in 2010, which caused a major air traffic halts and flight cancellations in Europe and neighboring areas.
 Hekla
 Kverkfjöll
 Snæfellsjökull
 Öræfajökull

Norway 
 Beerenberg in Jan Mayen, the world's northernmost active volcano

Oceania

French Polynesia 
 Mehetia in Windward Islands of the Society Islands

Northern Mariana Islands 
 Anatahan in Northern Mariana Islands

Australia 
 Hillwood Volcano in Tasmania

New Zealand 
 Waitākere volcano in Auckland
 Mount Taranaki in Egmont National Park in North Island
 Mount Ngauruhoe in North Island
 Mount Ruapehu in Tongariro National Park
 Whakaari/White Island in Bay of Plenty
 Banks Peninsula in Christchurch, South Island

Papua New Guinea 

 Mount Lamington, famous for the 1951 eruption whick killed 3,000 people.
 Tavurvur. Recently erupted in 2014.
 Ulawun, a Decade Volcano
 Kadovar, which erupted for the first recorded time in 2018

Solomon Islands 
 Kolombangara
 Nonda (volcano)
 Tinakula
 Mount Veve

See also
List of shield volcanoes
List of cinder cones
List of lava domes
List of subglacial volcanoes

References

External links
Global Volcanism Program

 Stratovolcanoes
 v